The 37th NAACP Image Awards ceremony, presented by the National Association for the Advancement of Colored People (NAACP), honored the best in film, television, music of 2005 and took place on February 26, 2006, at the Shrine Auditorium.

The following is a listing of nominees, with winners in bold:

Film
Outstanding Motion Picture
Coach Carter
 Crash 
Hitch
Hustle & Flow
Diary of a Mad Black Woman

Outstanding Actor in a Motion Picture
Laurence Fishburne - Assault on Precinct 13
 Samuel L. Jackson - Coach Carter 
Shemar Moore - Diary of a Mad Black Woman
Terrence Howard - Hustle & Flow
Will Smith - Hitch

Outstanding Actress in a Motion Picture
 Kimberly Elise - Diary of a Mad Black Woman 
Queen Latifah - Beauty Shop
Rosario Dawson - Rent
Ziyi Zhang - Memoirs of a Geisha
Zoe Saldana - Guess Who

Outstanding Supporting Actor in a Motion Picture
Anthony Anderson - Hustle & Flow
Chris "Ludacris" Bridges - Crash
Don Cheadle - Crash
Larenz Tate - Crash
 Terrence Howard - Crash 

Outstanding Supporting Actress in a Motion Picture
Ashanti - Coach Carter
 Cicely Tyson - Diary of a Mad Black Woman 
Elise Neal - Hustle & Flow
Taraji P. Henson - Hustle & Flow
Thandie Newton - Crash

Outstanding Independent or Foreign Film
 The Boys of Baraka 
Cape of Good Hope
The Constant Gardener
Mad Hot Ballroom
Syriana

Outstanding Directing in a Feature Film/Television Movie
George C. Wolfe – Lackawanna Blues
John Singleton – Four Brothers 
Malcolm Lee – Roll Bounce
Thomas Carter – Coach Carter
Tim Story – Fantastic Four

Television
Outstanding Comedy Series
The Bernie Mac Show
The Boondocks
 Everybody Hates Chris 
Girlfriends
Half & Half

Outstanding Actor in a Comedy Series
Bernie Mac - The Bernie Mac Show
Donald Faison - Scrubs
George Lopez - George Lopez
Omar Gooding - Barbershop: The Series
Tyler James Williams - Everybody Hates Chris

Outstanding Actress in a Comedy Series
Holly Robinson Peete - Love, Inc.
Jill Marie Jones - Girlfriends
Rachel True - Half & Half
Tichina Arnold - Everybody Hates Chris 
Tracee Ellis Ross - Girlfriends

Outstanding Supporting Actor in a Comedy Series
Chico Benymon - Half & Half
Kenan Thompson - Saturday Night Live
Mehcad Brooks - Desperate Housewives
Reggie Hayes - Girlfriends 
Terry Crews - Everybody Hates Chris

Outstanding Supporting Actress in a Comedy Series
Camille Winbush - The Bernie Mac Show 
Kellita Smith - The Bernie Mac Show
Telma Hopkins - Half & Half
Valarie Pettiford - Half & Half
Wanda Sykes - Curb Your Enthusiasm

Outstanding Drama Series
Commander In Chief
CSI: Miami
 Grey's Anatomy 
House
Lost

Outstanding Actor in a Drama Series
Hill Harper - CSI: NY
Ice-T - Law & Order: Special Victims Unit
Isaiah Washington - Grey's Anatomy 
Jesse L. Martin - Law & Order
Omar Epps - House

Outstanding Actress in a Drama Series
CCH Pounder - The Shield
Khandi Alexander - CSI: Miami
Kimberly Elise - Close to Home
Marianne Jean-Baptiste - Without A Trace
Vivica A. Fox - Missing 

Outstanding Supporting Actor in a Drama Series
Dennis Haysbert - 24
Gary Dourdan - CSI: Crime Scene Investigation 
Harry Lennix - Commander in Chief
James Pickens Jr. - Grey's Anatomy
Mekhi Phifer - ER

Outstanding Supporting Actress in a Drama Series
Aisha Tyler - 24
Chandra Wilson - Grey's Anatomy
Kerry Washington - Boston Legal
Pam Grier - The L Word
S. Epatha Merkerson - Law & Order 

Outstanding Television Movie, Mini-Series, or Dramatic Special
 Lackawanna Blues 
Mississippi Justice
Sometimes in April
The Reading Room
Their Eyes Were Watching God

Outstanding Actor in a Television Movie, Mini-Series, or Dramatic Special
Idris Elba - Sometimes in April
Jeffrey Wright - Lackawanna Blues
Michael Ealy - Their Eyes Were Watching God
Ruben Santiago-Hudson - Their Eyes Were Watching God
Terrence Dashon Howard - Lackawanna Blues 

Outstanding Actress in a Television Movie, Mini-Series, or Dramatic Special
Carmen Ejogo - Lackawanna Blues
Halle Berry - Their Eyes Were Watching God
Macy Gray - Lackawanna Blues
Rosie Perez - Lackawanna Blues
S. Epatha Merkerson - Lackawanna Blues 

Outstanding Actor in a Daytime Drama Series
Antonio Sabato Jr. - The Bold and the Beautiful
Bryton McClure - The Young and the Restless
Kristoff St. John - The Young and the Restless
Michael B. Jordan - All My Children
Shemar Moore - The Young and the Restless 

Outstanding Actress in a Daytime Drama Series
Christel Khalil - The Young and the Restless
Marla Gibbs - Passions
Tonya Lee Williams - The Young and the Restless
Tracey Ross - Passions
Victoria Rowell - The Young and the Restless 

Outstanding Television News, Talk, or Information (Series or Special)
CNN Coverage: Honoring Rosa Parks
Judge Mathis
 Tavis Smiley 
The Tyra Banks Show
Unforgivable Blackness: The Rise and Fall of Jack Johnson

Outstanding Variety (Series or Special)
2005 Black Movie Awards – A Celebration of Black Cinema: Past, Present, and Future
77th Academy Awards
 BET Awards 2005 
Mo'Nique's Fat Chance
Russell Simmons Presents Def Poetry

Outstanding Performance in a Youth/Children's Series or Special
Jo Marie Payton – The Proud Family Movie
Kevin Clash – Sesame Street
Kyla Pratt – The Proud Family Movie
Raven-Symoné – That's So Raven 
Tommy Davidson – The Proud Family Movie

Outstanding Directing in a Dramatic Series
Janice Cooke-Leonard – Charmed
Janice Cooke-Leonard – One Tree Hill
Janice Cooke-Leonard – Summerland
Paris Barclay – Cold Case 
Phillip G. Atwell – The Shield

Outstanding Directing in a Comedy Series
Eric Dean Seaton – That's So Raven
James D. Wilcox – My Wife & Kids
Ken Whittingham – Everybody Hates Chris
Mattie C. Caruthers – My Wife & Kids
Millicent Shelton – The Bernie Mac Show

Literature
Outstanding Literary Work – Fiction
72 Hour Hold – Bebe Moore Campbell
Fledging – Octavia Butler
 Breaking the Cycle – Zane
Cinnamon Kiss – Walter Mosley
Genevieve: A Novel – Eric Jerome Dickey

Outstanding Literary Work – Non-Fiction
Blue Rage, Black Redemption: A Memoir by Stanley Tookie Williams – Stanley Tookie Williams
 Is Bill Cosby Right? Or Has The Black Middle Class Lost Its Mind? – Michael Eric Dyson
The Autobiography of Medgar Evers: A Hero's Life and Legacy Revealed Through His Writings, Letters and Speeches – Edited by Myrlie Evers-Williams and Manning Marable
50 Years After Brown: The State of Black Equality in America – Anthony Asadullah Samad
Winning The Race: Beyond The Crisis In Black America – John McWhorter

Outstanding Literary Work – Children's
 Girls Hold Up This World – Jada Pinkett Smith
I Can Make A Difference – Marian Wright Edelman
The School Is Not White! A True Story of the Civil Rights Movement – Doreen Rappaport
Honey Baby Sugar Child – Alice Faye Duncan
Please, Puppy, Please – Spike Lee

Music
References:

Outstanding New Artist
Bobby Valentino
Chris Brown
Keyshia Cole
Leela James
Omarion

Outstanding Male Artist
Common
Jamie Foxx
Kanye West
Kem
Stevie Wonder

Outstanding Female Artist
Alicia Keys
India.Arie
Mariah Carey
Mary J. Blige
Toni Braxton

Outstanding Duo or Group
The Black Eyed Peas
Destiny's Child
Earth, Wind, & Fire
Floetry
Ray Charles and Various Artists

Outstanding Jazz Artist
Billy Miles
Jermaine Gardner
Mike Phillips
Najee
Onaje Allan Gumbs

Outstanding Gospel Artist (Traditional or Contemporary)
CeCe Winans – Purified
Donnie McClurkin – Psalms, Hymns, & Spiritual Songs
Kirk Franklin – Hero
Mary Mary – Mary Mary
Yolanda Adams – Day by Day 

Outstanding Music Video
Alicia Keys – Unbreakable 
Common  – Testify
Destiny's Child – Stand Up For Love
Kanye West – Diamonds From Sierra Leone
Mariah Carey – We Belong Together

Outstanding Song
Be Without You – Mary J. Blige
Diamonds From Sierra Leone – Kanye West
I Can’t Stop Loving You – Kem
 Unbreakable – Alicia Keys
We Belong Together – Mariah Carey

Outstanding Album
Alicia Keys Unplugged – Alicia Keys
The Breakthrough - Mary J. Blige
 Emancipation of Mimi – Mariah Carey
Late Registration – Kanye West
So Amazing: An All-Star Tribute to Luther Vandross – Luther Vandross and Various Artists

References

External links
Official site

NAACP Image Awards
Naacp Image Awards
Naacp Image Awards
Naacp Image Awards